American country music singer-songwriter Shane McAnally has written songs both for himself, on his self-titled debut album, and for others.

In 2008, McAnally co-wrote Lee Ann Womack's single "Last Call". In 2010, he had his first No. 1 on Hot Country Songs as a songwriter with Kenny Chesney's "Somewhere with You". Other songs that McAnally has written that have reached No. 1 on the country charts include "Kiss Tomorrow Goodbye" by Luke Bryan, "Alone with You" by Jake Owen, "Come Over", "American Kids", "Wild Child" by Kenny Chesney, "Better Dig Two" by The Band Perry, "Say You Do"  and "Different For Girls" by Dierks Bentley, "John Cougar, John Deere, John 3:16" by Keith Urban, "Stay a Little Longer" by Brothers Osborne, "I Met a Girl" by William Michael Morgan, "Mama's Broken Heart" and "Vice" by Miranda Lambert, "If I Told You" by Darius Rucker, "Young & Crazy" by Frankie Ballard, "T-Shirt", "Unforgettable" and "Marry Me" by Thomas Rhett, "Leave the Night On", "Take Your Time" and "Body Like a Back Road" by Sam Hunt, "Drinkin' Problem" by Midland and "Get Along" by Kenny Chesney. McAnally reached No. 1 with Old Dominion's "Written In The Sand" and "Make It Sweet". McAnally is closely associated with Kacey Musgraves, having co-written several songs on three of her major-label albums, Same Trailer Different Park, Pageant Material, and Golden Hour (album).

Songs written by McAnally

References

McAnally, Shane